Smaragdina salicina is a species of short-horned leaf beetles belonging to the family Chrysomelidae, subfamily Clytrinae.

This leaf beetle lives in Europe, in the eastern Palearctic realm, and in the Near East.

The colours of head and elytra of this beetle are dark blue, while pronotum is reddish and legs are yellowish.

They mainly feed on Salix and Crataegus species, but also on leaves of various other plants (Blackthorn Prunus spinosa, Trifolium species, etc.).

At the time of egg-laying they wrap their eggs in an envelope of their own excrement and drop them on the ground from above, manoeuvring with their hind legs.

External links
 Biolib
 Culex
 Fauna Europaea

Clytrina
Beetles of Europe
Beetles described in 1763
Taxa named by Giovanni Antonio Scopoli